The Battle of Saddada Castle was a battle fought between the Libyan National Army, and the Sirte Protection Force and the Benghazi Defense Brigades on 19 December 2018, which took place in Saddada Castle, between Misrata and Bani Walid. After brief clashes inside the castle, the LNA captured the site. The Sirte Protection Force denied losing the town.
  
The battle followed a series of LNA advances in Misrata Province earlier that week.

References 

Saddada Castle
2018 in Libya
Military operations of the Second Libyan Civil War